Léonard Aggoune (born 18 December 1997) is a French professional footballer who plays as a goalkeeper for Championnat National 2 club Moulins Yzeure.

Career
Developed in Paris Saint-Germain Youth Academy, Aggoune was part of club's reserve side during 2015–16 and 2016–17 seasons. His playing minutes were however limited as Rémy Descamps was team's first-choice goalkeeper. Aggoune was also part of club's under-19 team which reached final of 2015–16 UEFA Youth League.

Aggoune signed for Cypriot club Pafos prior to 2017–18 season. He made his professional debut on 21 April 2018 in a 1–0 win against Ermis Aradippou. He signed for Championnat National 2 club Créteil in August 2018. After spending two seasons at Les Ulis, Aggoune returned to Créteil in July 2021.

References

External links
 

1997 births
Living people
Footballers from Paris
Association football goalkeepers
French footballers
Championnat National 2 players
Cypriot First Division players
Championnat National 3 players
Pafos FC players
US Créteil-Lusitanos players
CO Les Ulis players
French expatriate footballers
French expatriate sportspeople in Cyprus
Expatriate footballers in Cyprus